Brittany and Brianna Winner, also known as the Winner Twins (born 1995), are science fiction authors known for their popular self-published novels.

Biography 

Brianna and Brittany were born in 1995, and developed dyslexia and dysgraphia. They began writing in middle school with their father, under the pen name J.B.B. Winner. They published their first novel,The Strand Prophecy, when they were 12, and it attracted national attention by the following year. It was an illustrated story about a rapid evolutionary cycle on Earth, with a scientist superhero as the lead character.

In 2018, they began collaborating with Todd McCaffrey, publishing the Twin Soul series and the novel The Magpie's War.

They co-founded a non-profit, Motivate 2 Learn, to promote youth literacy and education and to inspire children with learning disabilities like dyslexia and ADHD.

Publications

Novels 
 The Strand Prophecy (2006) (Missile Rider Publishing)
 Extinction's Embrace (2009) (Howler Publishing)
 Perfect Compatibility Test  (2017)
Twin Soul Series 2018-2021 (series of 20 short stories, with Todd McCaffrey)
The Magpie's War (2021) (with Todd McCaffrey)

Non-Fiction 
 The Write Path: Navigating Storytelling (2017*)
 Millennium Madness poetry anthology (Brianna Winner, 2019)

Reception 
Their first novel The Strand Prophecy was a semi-finalist for an Independent Publishers Book Award, nominated for an IBPA Benjamin Franklin Award, and was inducted into the National Accelerated Reader Program.

They received Pinnacle Awards for excellence in teaching from the Center for Interactive Learning and Collaboration (CILC) in 2012, 2013 and 2014.  They also contributed essays on creative writing to the 2014 Penguin Books anthology Now Write! Science Fiction, Fantasy and Horror.

They were featured presenters at the first annual Geekie Awards in August, 2013, and special guests of honor at BayCon 2015's Women of Wonder.

References

External links 
YouTube channel – JBB Winner
YouTube :: The Winner Twins and Richard Hatch present at The Geekie Awards

Year of birth missing (living people)
Living people
Identical twins
American twins
American science fiction writers
21st-century American novelists
21st-century American women writers
Women science fiction and fantasy writers